Thi. Ka. Sivasankaran or T. G. Sivasankaran (30 March 1925 – 25 March 2014), was a Tamil writer and critic from Tamil Nadu, India. He is popularly known by his Tamil initials as Thi. Ka. Si.

Sivasankaran was born in Tirunelveli. His works were first published in the literary journal Grama oozhiyan in 1947. He was a Marxist by political orientation and a member of the Communist Party of India (CPI). He was influential in the party's literary journal Thamarai. He was a friend and contemporary of socialist writers like Vallikannan and T. M. Chidambara Ragunathan. During his years in Thamarai, he was instrumental in discovering and encouraging new writers like Prapanchan, D. Selvaraj, Poomani, Vannadhasan, Tamil Nadan and Jayanthan. In 2000, he was awarded the Sahitya Akademi Award for Tamil for his literary criticism Vimarsanangal Mathippuraikal Pettikal (lit. Criticisms, Reviews and Interviews). In 2008, a documentary film on him was released by the Chennai Tamil Koodam. In 2010, the formation of a charitable trust in his name at the Thanjavur Tamil University was announced. He is the father of Tamil writer Vannadhasan.

Awards and recognitions
Sahitya Akademi Award (2000)
Government of Tamil Nadu literary award (2002)
Bharathi Ilakkiya award
Lilly Deivasigamani Literary Trust award
Tamil Sanror peravai award

Partial bibliography
Thi. Ka. Si. Katturaigal
Vimarsanangal Mathippuraikal Pettikal
Vimarana Tamil

See also
 List of Indian writers

References

2014 deaths
Writers from Tamil Nadu
Recipients of the Sahitya Akademi Award in Tamil
Tamil writers
1925 births
Indian Tamil people
20th-century Indian essayists